Huarisallana (possibly from Aymara wari vicuña, salla rocks, cliffs, Quechua salla large cliff of gravel, -na a suffix) is a mountain in the Vilcanota mountain range in the Andes of Peru, about  high. It is located in the Cusco Region, Canchis Province, Checacupe District. Huarisallana lies near the Sequeñamayu valley, south of Intijahuana.

References

Mountains of Peru
Mountains of Cusco Region